Latest Record Project, Volume 1  is the 42nd studio album by Northern Irish singer-songwriter Van Morrison, released on 7 May 2021 by Exile Productions and BMG. The 28-track album includes the songs "Why Are You on Facebook?", "They Own the Media" and "Western Man". Released as a 2-CD set and on triple vinyl, the album marked a return to the UK Top Ten for Morrison, making the 2020s the fourth consecutive decade in which he has reached those heights. It was his first album in 25 years not to chart in Ireland.

Critical reception

While the album charted in the Top Ten in half a dozen countries, it received a "mixed or average" response, scoring 52 / 100 on review aggregator Metacritic. Reviewing the album for Rolling Stone, Jonathan Bernstein wrote that "Morrison's new record bears a strange resemblance to the unhinged, rambling feel of the pandemic-era internet: more often than not, its 28 tracks come across as a collection of shitposts, subtweets, and Reddit rants set to knockoff John Lee Hooker grooves." Alexis Petridis of The Guardian gave the album just one star in his review, praising the musical arrangements and performances while criticising its lyrical content as "boring and paranoid", describing the total product as "a genuinely depressing listen". Elizabeth Nelson of Pitchfork expressed a similar sentiment in her review, stating that "as with all things Van, his genius consistently shines through irrespective of the asinine context", while simultaneously describing Morrison's lyricism as egotistical and "transparently insane". Both Petridis and Nelson additionally commented on the presence of alt-right themes within the album. 

Ireland's Business Post said the album was "a late-career highlight" for Morrison who "displays an innate understanding of what swings with unusually direct lyrics". For Classic Rock, Morrison is "surprisingly enjoyable on (an) album of grumpy but bouncy R&B", while Artsfuse concluded that the "[prickly] and polemical tunes are surrounded by some of the most enjoyable music Van Morrison has made in years", and found it "at various points, inspired, insipid, and infuriating". Armond White of National Review welcomed the album as "true, rich protest", finding that Morrison's "emotional-political drive dares (to) oppose genuine political conformity". Jackie Hayden wrote in Hot Press that while "Van Morrison is an angry man ageing disgracefully... [such] is the sense of confrontational immediacy, there's hardly a track that doesn't justify the price of admission". The Scotsman praised the band who "remain mellow, intuitive and freewheeling throughout".

Track listing

Musicians 
As posted on Discogs.
 Van Morrison : Vocals, acoustic and electric guitars, piano, harmonica, alto saxophone
 Dave Keary : Electric guitar, acoustic guitar, classical guitar, mandolin, banjo, backing vocals
 Jim Mullen : Electric guitar
 Pete Hurley : Bass guitar
 Paul Moore : Bass guitar
 Gavin Scott ; Bass guitar
 Stuart McIlroy : Piano 
 Paul Moran : Piano, Hammond organ
 Richard Dunn : Piano, Hammond organ, Clavinet
 Chris J White : Tenor saxophone 
 Alistair White ; Trombone 
 Crawford Bell, Dana Masters, Kelly Smiley : Backing vocals
 Mez Clough : Drums, backing vocals
 Colin Griffin : Drums, percussion
 Jeff Lardner : Drums
 Teena Lyle : Percussion, vibraphone, backing vocals
 Ben McAuley : Percussion
 P.J. Proby : Vocals
 Chris Farlowe : Vocals

Charts

References

2021 albums
Van Morrison albums
Albums produced by Van Morrison